David Robson may refer to:

David Robson (footballer, born 1873), Scottish footballer
David Robson (footballer, born 2002), Welsh football goalkeeper